Completion may refer to:

Completion (American football)
Completion (oil and gas wells)
 Completion, a 2004 studio album by Bodychoke
 One of the landmarks in conveyancing, transfer of the title of property from one person to another

Mathematics 
Completion (metric space), constructing the smallest complete metric space containing a given space
 Construction of a complete measure space
Dedekind–MacNeille completion, constructing the smallest complete lattice containing a given partial order
Completion (algebra)

Computer science 
Autocomplete, predicting a phrase the user is about to type in
Knuth–Bendix completion algorithm, transforming an equation set into a confluent term rewriting system

See also 
 Completeness (disambiguation)